Richard Diamond, Private Detective is an American detective drama, created by Blake Edwards, which aired on radio from 1949 to 1953, and on television from 1957 to 1960.

Radio
Dick Powell starred in the Richard Diamond, Private Detective radio series as a wisecracking former police officer turned private detective. Episodes typically open with a client visiting or calling cash-strapped Diamond's office and agreeing to his fee of $100 a day plus expenses, or Diamond taking on a case at the behest of his friend and former partner, Lt. Walter Levinson. Diamond often suffers a blow to the head in his sleuthing pursuits. Most episodes end with Diamond at the piano, singing a standard, popular song, or showtune from Powell's repertoire to Helen Asher (his girlfriend) in her penthouse at 975 Park Avenue.

Levinson was played variously by Ed Begley, Arthur Q. Bryan, Ted DeCorsia and Alan Reed. Helen was played by Virginia Gregg and others. Another regular cast member was Wilms Herbert as Walt's bumbling sergeant, Otis, who also "doubled" on the show as Helen's butler, Francis.

Many of the shows were either written or directed by Edwards. Its theme, "Leave It to Love", was whistled by Powell at the beginning of each episode.

It began airing on NBC Radio on April 24, 1949, picked up Rexall as a sponsor on April 5, 1950, and continued until December 6, 1950. With Camel cigarettes as a sponsor, it moved to ABC from January 5, 1951, to June 29, 1951, with Rexall returning for a run from October 5, 1951, until June 27, 1952. Substituting for Amos 'n' Andy, it aired Sunday evenings on CBS (again, for Rexall) from May 31, 1953 until September 20, 1953.

Television series

Dick Powell's company, Four Star Television, produced the television version of Richard Diamond, Private Detective, which premiered in the summer of 1957 on CBS. It returned to CBS in January 1958 for the second season and in February 1959 for the third season, again on CBS. In the fall of 1959, the fourth and final season aired on NBC.

David Janssen, before The Fugitive, starred as Diamond, a former officer of the New York Police Department and a hard-boiled private detective in the film noir tradition. Don Taylor played the title role in a 1956 television pilot, broadcast as an episode of the anthology series Chevron Hall of Stars. The first two television seasons followed radio's characterization the most closely (several episodes were adapted from the radio series). Diamond, known for his charm and wisecracks as much as his virility, was still based in New York, though Janssen never sat at a piano and sang, as Powell had typically ended most of the radio episodes. In the noirish opening sequence, clad in hat, suit, and tie, he walks down a dimly lit street toward the camera and lights up a cigarette, the light revealing his face. After the first season when the sponsor was Maxwell House, the show was sponsored by Kent cigarettes, and Frank DeVol’s playfully mysterious theme was heard underneath an announcer hawking either "Maxwell House – Good to the Last Drop" or “Kent with the Micronite filter.” In syndicated rebroadcasts of the series, the revised title, Call Mr. D., flashes on the screen, and DeVol's music is replaced by Pete Rugolo’s far more recognizable theme—although that did not appear until Season 3.

Following the second season, the setting was switched from New York City to Los Angeles,  and the production was entirely redesigned. The 18 episodes comprising Season 3 aired from February to mid-June of 1959, and Diamond’s character now bore only slight resemblance to his California-based noirish predecessors Sam Spade and Philip Marlowe.  By the late 1950s, the glamour of Hollywood was becoming an irresistible fantasy for millions of viewers, and the popularity of Warner Brothers’ 77 Sunset Strip—which involved a good deal of location shooting and began airing four months before Diamond's third season—undoubtedly influenced a newer P. I. image that often seemed more inspired by Hugh Hefner than by Dashiell Hammett. Diamond no longer occupied a low-rent, cloistered office, but now operated from a modern, beautifully appointed ranch house—complete with a swimming pool—in the Hollywood Hills. With panoramic sliding glass doors providing views of the mountains and the city, his sunken living room featured a bar and a loveseat, where he could be found many evenings entertaining young women before a fire. Following the lead of the Sunset Strip private eyes, he also drove a convertible—in this case a 1959 DeSoto Fireflite. The Hefner-like fantasy was enhanced by gadgets, especially Diamond's car phone, which connected him directly to an answering service overseen by the shapely, enigmatic “Sam.” Season 3's modern, more youthful ambience was complemented by a jazz score by composer/arranger Pete Rugolo, who created a set of big-band, Stan Kenton-esque cues for each of the episodes. In the highly stylized opening sequence, Rugolo's robust theme is preceded by tense melodic fragments underscoring  a series of frenetic, silhouette images of Diamond running, before walking forward—again in hat, suit, and tie—to light a cigarette, suggesting a re-boot of the original noirish conception. (Rugolo's score soon became so popular that in 1959 a full album of his Diamond cues, The Music from Richard Diamond, was released on the Mercury label.)

In the fourth season, which aired on NBC, the writers retained Los Angeles as the setting, but the Hefner-esque fantasy elements were considerably toned down. Now Diamond again operated from an office reminiscent of what he had known in New York, and his beautiful ranch house was replaced by an attractive—though more conventional—apartment.  His car phone still connected him to Sam, but he now drove a 1959 Ford Galaxie convertible—absent the impressive tail fins of his DeSoto. Though the opening titles remained, Rugolo's score was replaced by a more sedate theme, "Nervous" by Richard Shores, later to be used during the highlight sequence that began every episode of The Dick Powell Show. The CBS Season 3 re-boot had aired on Sunday nights at 10 pm, but NBC moved the time slot to 7:30 pm Monday, and Season 4 began airing on October 5, 1959, with a 17-episode run that concluded late in January.  Because its numbers were no longer strong, the season's nine additional episodes were delayed, resuming only as a summer replacement on Tuesday, July 5, 1960, and concluding in early September.  Though the old noirish elements were more prominent, the look of the final season seems inspired more by cost-cutting than aesthetics, and the production values appear far less glamorous than Season 3.

In addition to Janssen, the series had other recurring characters. Mirroring Diamond's history with the New York Police Department, the radio version featured his friend, police Lt. Walt Levinson (often played by Ed Begley, Sr.), and on TV, veteran actor Regis Toomey, portraying Diamond's former superior,  Lt. Dennis "Mac" McGough, came aboard in the first episode, which aired in July 1957. Toomey then appeared intermittently in seven more, including “Snow Queen,” the final episode of Season 2, which aired on June 26, 1958.  Radio's version also gave Diamond a steady girl friend, wealthy socialite Helen Asher (played by Virginia Gregg), a story arc that was neglected by television until the first episode of Season 3, when Diamond meets fashion designer Karen Wells, played by Barbara Bain. But this may have created a conundrum for the producers, since radio's Diamond was also an unrestrained flirt, and Powell's character often shamelessly ogled his beautiful clients before returning to Helen each week.  In one TV episode, “Soft Touch,” Karen catches Diamond about to two-time her, and after five episodes, the “steady-girl-friend” arc had disappeared, with Diamond once again playing the field.  When he first reached Los Angeles, Diamond had no history with the local police, and his encounters with them are often contentious. In Season 4, Russ Conway  was cast as Lieutenant Pete Kile for five episodes, and their relationship soon turns to one of mutual respect, if not always warmth.  The omnipresent Sam entered the picture (at least partially—viewers never saw much of her face) in Season 3 and remained for the duration of the series. She was played for most of Season 3 by Mary Tyler Moore in her first regular series role, and later replaced by Roxane Brooks.

Cast
 David Janssen as Richard Diamond
 Regis Toomey as Lt. Dennis "Mac" McGough (seasons 1–2)
 Russ Conway as Lt. Pete Kile (season 4)
 Barbara Bain as Karen Wells (season 3)
 Mary Tyler Moore as Sam (season 3)
 Roxane Brooks as Sam (seasons 3–4)

Television guest stars

 Nick Adams
 Philip Ahn
 Charles Aidman
 Claude Akins
 Frank Albertson
 Jack Albertson
 Chris Alcaide
 Merry Anders
 John Anderson
 Eleanor Audley
 Phyllis Avery
 Joanna Barnes
 Patricia Barry
 Harry Bartell
 Arthur Batanides
 Barbara Baxley
 Don Beddoe
 Ed Begley
 Harry Bellaver
 John Beradino
 James Best
 Edward Binns
 Joey Bishop
 Patricia Blair
 Whitney Blake
 Dan Blocker
 Willis Bouchey
 Lane Bradford
 Jocelyn Brando
 Steve Brodie
 Charles Bronson
 Hillary Brooke
 Geraldine Brooks
 Richard Carlyle
 Jack Cassidy
 Phyllis Coates
 Joe Conley
 Ellen Corby
 Jerome Cowan
 Christopher Dark
 Ted de Corsia
 Francis De Sales
 King Donovan

 Richard Devon
 Brad Dexter
 Lawrence Dobkin
 James Drury
 Don Durant
 Jack Elam
 Ross Elliott
 Tommy Farrell
 James Flavin
 Dick Foran
 Robert Foulk
 Douglas Fowley
 Robert Gist
 Ned Glass
 Barry Gordon
 Tom Greenway
 Dabbs Greer
 Virginia Gregg
 Don Haggerty
 Kipp Hamilton
 Peter Hansen
 Stacy Harris
 Irene Hervey
 Jonathan Hole
 James Hong
 Clegg Hoyt
 John Hoyt
 Robert Karnes
 Don Keefer
 DeForest Kelley
 Sandy Kenyon
 Gail Kobe
 Charles Lane
 Joi Lansing
 Harry Lauter
 Ruta Lee
 Peter Leeds

 Bethel Leslie
 Nan Leslie
 Lisa Lu
 Keye Luke
 John Lupton
 Ross Martin
 Sean McClory
 Howard McNear
 Carole Mathews
 Joyce Meadows
 Eve Miller
 John Mitchum
 Rita Moreno
 Vic Morrow
 Jeanette Nolan
 Jay Novello
 Alan Reed
 Richard Reeves
 Stafford Repp
 Addison Richards
 Mark Roberts
 Carlos Romero
 Hayden Rorke
 Mort Sahl
 Walter Sande
 Gloria Saunders
 William Schallert
 Jacqueline Scott
 Karen Sharpe
 Doris Singleton
 Lyle Talbot
 Gloria Talbott
 Vaughn Taylor
 Lee Van Cleef
 Herb Vigran
 June Vincent
 James Westerfield
 Jesse White
 Jean Willes
 Gloria Winters

Television episode list

Season 1: 1957

Season 2: 1958

Season 3: 1959–60

Season 4: 1960

Adaptations
In 1968, Four Star president David Charnay announced a feature film revival starring David Janssen, but nothing came of the plans. A pair of unauthorized Richard Diamond short stories set in 1948 were published in book form in 2016.

References

External links

 
 
 Richard Diamond, Private Eye at The Thrilling Detective web-site
 Richard Diamond Private Eye Podcast
 
 Richard Diamond, Private Eye theme by Pete Rugolo

1957 American television series debuts
1940s American radio programs
1960 American television series endings
1950s American crime drama television series
1960s American crime drama television series
American detective television series
American radio dramas
Black-and-white American television shows
1949 radio programme debuts
1953 radio programme endings
NBC radio programs
CBS Radio programs
ABC radio programs
Detective radio shows
Radio programs adapted into television shows
Television series based on radio series
CBS original programming
NBC original programming
Television series by Four Star Television
Television series by 20th Century Fox Television
Television shows set in New York City
Television shows set in Los Angeles